Ondřej Látal (born March 15, 1981 in Ústí nad Labem) is a Czech professional ice hockey player. He played with HC Sparta Praha in the Czech Extraliga during the 2010–11 Czech Extraliga postseason.

References

External links

1981 births
Czech ice hockey forwards
HC Sparta Praha players
Living people
Sportspeople from Ústí nad Labem
Sportspeople from Třebíč
Acadie–Bathurst Titan players
Stadion Hradec Králové players
SK Horácká Slavia Třebíč players
HC Kometa Brno players
HC Vrchlabí players
Czech expatriate ice hockey players in Canada